Franciszek Xavier "Frank" Rydzewski Jr. (November 16, 1892 – October 1979) was an American football player. He played seven seasons in the National Football League (NFL) with the Chicago Tigers (1920), Cleveland Tigers (1920), Hammond Pros (1920, 1922–1926), Chicago Cardinals (1921), Chicago Bears (1923), and Milwaukee Badgers (1925). Prior to joining the NFL, Rydzewski played college football at the University of Notre Dame from 1915 to 1917. He earned All-American honors in 1917. He served in the Army during World War I.

References

External links
 

1892 births
1979 deaths
American football centers
American football guards
American football tackles
Chicago Bears players
Chicago Cardinals players
Chicago Tigers players
Cleveland Tigers (NFL) players
Hammond Pros players
Milwaukee Badgers players
Notre Dame Fighting Irish football players
All-American college football players
Players of American football from Chicago
American people of Polish descent